Frankfurt (Main) Galluswarte station is a railway station located in the Gallus district of Frankfurt, Germany.

History

The station was opened on 28 May 1978 and is named after a nearby medieval watchtower (the Galluswarte), which was named after the Galgenfeld ("gallows field", a place of execution). It consists of two tracks facing a 96 cm-high central platform on the Homburg Railway and two passing tracks on the Main-Weser Railway. There was formerly a junction at the station with a branch to the now closed main freight yard.

Location
At the southern end of the station, the Main-Weser line divides into ramps towards Frankfurt Central Station, connecting with the Main-Neckar line and the Taunus line.

The station is elevated above the streets of Mainzer Landstraße and Frankenallee. Escalators connect the platform and the two streets.

Services 
The station is served by S-Bahn lines S3, S4, S5 and S6. Intercity and regional trains run past on the Main Weser tracks, which have no platforms at Galluswarte.

Below the station, on Mainzer Landstraße, there is an interchange with tram lines 11 and 21, and with bus line 52.

References

Railway stations in Frankfurt
Rhine-Main S-Bahn stations
Railway stations in Germany opened in 1978
1978 establishments in West Germany